Raj Bharath is an Indian actor who has appeared in Tamil language films.

Career
Raj Bharath is the son of Malliyam Rajagopal,a film director and producer, who had been active in the 1970s. Raj Bharath briefly worked with Infosys. He handed out his portfolio to prominent directors, before gaining an opportunity to portray a small role in Sasi's Ainthu Ainthu Ainthu as an assistant to the villainous character portrayed by Sudesh Berry. Director Mysskin cast him as a villain in a wheelchair in the thriller Onaayum Aattukkuttiyum (2013), which Raj Bharath described as an "important breakthrough".

Filmography

References

External links

Living people
Male actors in Tamil cinema
21st-century Indian male actors
Indian male film actors
Year of birth missing (living people)